Tanauan may refer to either of two places in the Philippines:

Tanauan, Batangas
Tanauan, Leyte